Korchi is a Village and a tehsil in Gadchiroli district in the Indian state of Maharashtra. It is about 1012 km from the capital city, Mumbai.

The town is good for its connectivity and facilities compared to rest of the area around.

It is part of Kurkheda Sub-division of Gadchiroli district along with Kurkheda, Korchi tehsils.

Demographics 
As per Indian government census of 2011, the population was 42,811.

References

Cities and towns in Gadchiroli district
Talukas in Maharashtra